The Beninese passport is issued to citizens of the Benin for international travel.

Physical appearance 
The regular biometric Beninese passport is a travel document issued to people of Beninese nationality. The document contains thirty-two pages and complies with international security standards. The cover of the passport is a dark green (olive) colour.  In the lower central part is the national coat of arms. At the bottom is the inscription "Passport" (fr. Passeport). Above the coat of arms is 'Republic of Benin' (fr. Republique du Benin). The validity period of an ordinary biometric passport is six years.

Languages
The data page/information page is printed in French and English.

See also 
 List of passports
 Visa requirements for Beninese citizens

References 

Passports by country
Government of Benin